HSBC Bank Brasil S.A. - Banco Múltiplo is subsidiary of Banco Bradesco in Brazil.

HSBC established Banco HSBC Bamerindus SA to take over Banco Bamerindus do Brasil S.A. in March 1997 and the bank’s name was changed to HSBC Bank Brasil S.A. - Banco Múltiplo in 1999. It was HSBC's lead regional subsidiary in South America and as such it was the regional reporting line for several other countries. It was sold to Bradesco in June 2016.

The bank is among the ten largest in Brazil, with more than 1,700 branches and sub-branches in 550 Brazilian cities. The headquarters are located in Curitiba.

History

The HSBC Group traces its presence in Brazil to 1976 when Samuel Montagu and Midland Bank opened offices there. What started as a 6.14 per cent shareholding in Banco Bamerindus do Brasil in 1995 led to the Group's acquisition of selected assets, liabilities, and subsidiaries of Banco Bamerindus do Brasil in 1997 and the establishment of Banco HSBC Bamerindus S.A. HSBC bought Banco Bamerindus from the  Central Bank of Brazil, which had had to take it over. Banco Bamerindus had been established in 1952. By the time of its acquisition, Banco Bamerindus had almost 1,300 branches, plus insurance, leasing and securities businesses, among others.

In 2003, HSBC bought the Brazilian operations of Lloyds TSB, which included its corporate and wholesale operations, a small retail network, and Losango, a consumer finance business, as well as some offshore assets. The purchase price was US$815m.

On 9 June 2015, HSBC announced its intention to sell off the majority of its operations in Brazil, including personal banking, as part of a plan to cut 50,000 jobs worldwide and on 3 August 2015 HSBC sold operations in Brazil to Banco Bradesco for $5.2 billion. The sale was approved on 8 June 2016 and transfer of customers was expected in October 2016.

See also

 HSBC

References

External links
 HSBC Bank Brasil website

Companies based in Curitiba
Brazil
Banks established in 1952
1952 establishments in Brazil
Brazilian subsidiaries of foreign companies